The Acts of Paul is one of the major works and earliest pseudepigraphal series from the New Testament apocrypha also known as Apocryphal Acts. This work is part of a body of literature either about or purporting to be written by Paul the Apostle, including letters, narratives, prayers, and apocalypses. An approximate date given to the Acts of Paul is 100-160 AD. The Acts of Paul were first mentioned by Tertullian, who deemed the work to be heretical because it encouraged women to preach and baptize. The Acts of Paul were considered orthodox by Hippolytus of Rome but were eventually regarded as heretical when the Manichaeans started using the texts. The author of the Acts of Paul is unknown, but probably came from a Christian community in Asia Minor that revered Paul.  The work does not use the canonical Acts of the Apostles as a source; instead it relies on oral traditions of Paul's missionary work. The text is primarily known from Greek manuscripts. The discovery of a Coptic language version of the text demonstrated that the text was composed of:
The Acts of Paul and Thecla
The Third Epistle to the Corinthians
The Martyrdom of the Holy Apostle Paul

All of these constituent parts were often considered worth treating as separate texts and frequently appeared independently, leading to speculation that the Acts of Paul may have been compiling disparate stories into one work, although other parts scholars believe to be original to the Acts of Paul. Besides the four main sections mentioned above, the remainder of the Acts of Paul exist only in fragments from the 3rd and 5th centuries:
The Healing of Hermocrates from Dropsy
The Strife of the Ephesian Beasts

The texts are a coherent whole and are generally thought to have been written by one author using oral traditions, rather than basing it on any of the other apocrypha or the orthodox canon. The main emphasis of the text is on chastity and anti-Gnosticism. According to Tertullian, the author was a priest in Asia Minor. While the priest encouraged female ministry, he expressed doctrinal orthodoxy in regard to continence and Resurrection. Also, they mentioned the close relationship between sexual purity and salvation.

Overview
The Acts of Paul — which was declared to be antilegomena by Eusebius in his Church History — consists of narratives depicting Paul's preaching and other activities, such as the Acts of Paul and Thecla, Paul's Correspondence With the Corinthians, and the Martyrdom of the Holy Apostle Paul.

Paul's Correspondence With the Corinthians was written roughly a century after the death of Paul, with the intention of correcting perceived misinterpretations of Paul's first and second epistles, as well as to counter certain Gnostic teachings. This work consists of two letters. The first letter is the Epistle of the Corinthians to Paul, in which the author tells the story of how two presbyters had come to Corinth, preaching "pernicious words". Specifically, they claimed that God is not almighty, there is no resurrection of the body, man was not created by God, Christ had not come in the flesh, nor was he born of Mary, and the world was created not by God but rather by angels. The second letter is Paul's response to the first. In this letter, the author repudiates all of the claims made by the two presbyters.

The Martyrdom of the Holy Apostle Paul tells the story of Paul's last days in Rome. Upon learning that Paul had resurrected a young man who had died after falling from a parapet, Nero became fearful that the Roman Empire might be overthrown by the Christians. This was the event that precipitated the Neronian persecution of Christians in general, as well as the specific order to behead Paul. According to this work, when Paul was beheaded, milk — rather than blood — spurted from his neck.

Richard J. Bauckham argues that the author of the Acts of Paul drew directly from 2 Timothy in addition to 1 and 2 Corinthians to write a sequel to the Acts of the Apostles based on their understanding of Paul’s final years.

See also
 Acts of Paul and Thecla
 Acts of Peter and Paul
 Apocalypse of Paul
 Coptic Apocalypse of Paul
 Correspondence of Paul and Seneca
 Epistle to the Laodiceans
 Leucius Charinus
 Prayer of the Apostle Paul

References

Bibliography 
 .
  (Latin Texts, critical edition, German commentary on the versions).
 Richard Adelbert Lipsius, Maximilian Bonnet (editors): Acta apostolorum apocrypha vol. 1 1891. pp. 104–17, 235–72 (Greek text).
 Richard I. Pervo: The Acts of Paul: A New Translation with Introduction and Commentary. Cambridge: James Clarke & Co, 2014.
 Eckhard Plümacher: Paulys Realencyclopädie der Classischen Altertumswissenschaft, Supplement, 1978, col. 24–30; 51; 59–61.
 Willy Rordorf: Lex orandi, lex credendi, 1993, p. 368-496.
 Carl Schmidt (editor): Acta Pauli aus der Heidelberger koptischen Papyrushandschrift Nr. 1, Herausgegeben von Carl Schmidt, Übersetzungen, Untersuchungen und Koptischer Text, Hinrichs, Leipzig 1904. (Coptic Text, German translation + commentary).
 Carl Schmidt: Acta Pauli, Übersetzung Untersuchungen und koptischer Text, zweite erweiterte Ausgabe ohne Tafeln, Hinrichs, Leipzig 1905 (1964 reprint). (Enhanced edition without the plates)
 Carl Schmidt (editor): Πράξεις Παύλου; Acta Pauli. Nach dem Papyrus der Hamburger Staats- und Universitäts-Bibliothek, unter Mitarbeit von Wilhelm Schubart. Veröffentlichungen aus der Hamburger Staats- und Universitätsbibliothek. Neue Folge der Veröffentlichungen aus der Hamburger Stadtbibliothek, Herausgegeben von Gustav Wahl, J. J. Augustin in Glückstadt und Hamburg 1936 (Greek text, German translation and commentary).
 Wilhelm Schneemelcher (editor): Neutestamentliche Apokryphen in deutscher Übersetzung, Bd II Apostolisches, Apokalypsen und Verwandtes, 6. Aufl. Tübingen 1997. p. 193–243.
  (II Cor.)
 Paul Vetter: Der apokryhe 3. Korintherbrief, Mechitharisten-Buchdruckerei Wien 1894. (Armenian text of 3. Kor.)

External links

 , translation and commentary by M. R. James in the 1924 book The Apocryphal New Testament
  Acta Pauli A website devoted to an international, scholarly discussion of the Acts of Paul.

2nd-century Christian texts
Paul
Christian anti-Gnosticism
Texts in Coptic
Texts in Koine Greek
Antilegomena
Paul the Apostle